was a Japanese singer. Her nickname was Mico (also spelled Miko).

Hirota was born in Setagaya, Tokyo. She grew up listening to pop and jazz in places like Tachikawa, which was frequented by Occupation troops. She made her debut in 1961 at age 14. In 1965, Mico became the first Japanese singer to sing the song "Sunny" on album and the first to appear at the Newport Jazz Festival.

Mico appeared on the NHK New Year's Eve Kōhaku Uta Gassen eight times. Her first performance was in 1962, when she sang the Connie Francis tune "Vacation." NHK tapped her for the next four years in succession, and again in 1969, 1970, and 1971.

She sang the theme song, "Leo no Uta", for the animated television series Kimba the White Lion.

Hirota's commercial career included endorsements for Nescafé, Nippon Oil, Daikin Industries, Fujiya, Renown, and Sapporo Beer.

Hirota died on July 21, 2020 at the age of 73 following a fall. She became one of eight recipients of the Special Lifetime Achievement Award at the 62nd Japan Record Awards.

Kōhaku Uta Gassen appearances

Sources 
This article incorporates material from 弘田三枝子 (Hirota Mieko) in the Japanese Wikipedia, retrieved on February 10, 2008.

External links 
 TEZUKA OSAMU @ WORLD : ANIME STATION ジャングル大帝 site
 Official blog

1947 births
Japanese women singers
Musicians from Setagaya
2020 deaths
Japanese women jazz singers

Deaths from falls